The 2018–19 Slovenian Basketball League, also known as Liga Nova KBM due to sponsorship reasons, is the 28th season of the Premier A Slovenian Basketball League. Olimpija are the defending champions.

Format

Regular season
In the first phase, ten teams competed in a home-and-away round-robin series (18 games total). All teams advanced from the regular season to one of two postseason stages, depending on their league position.

Second phase
The top six teams from the regular season advanced to the championship phase. These teams started the second phase from scratch, with no results carrying over from the regular season. Each team played a total of 10 games in this phase; as in the regular season, a home-and-away round-robin was used.

The bottom four teams entered a home-and-away round-robin mini-league where two best teams qualify to quarterfinals. Each teams plays 9 games in this phase.

Playoffs
Eight teams joined the playoffs.

Teams

Venues and locations

Personnel and kits

Managerial changes

Regular season

League table

Results

Championship group

League table

Results

Relegation group

League table

Results

Playoffs
Seeded teams played at home games 1, 3 and, in the finals, 5.

Bracket

Quarter–finals

|}

Semi-finals

|}

Finals

|}

Awards

Regular Season MVP
 Davor Konjević (Šentjur)

Season MVP
 Marjan Čakarun (Sixt Primorska)

Finals MVP
 Marjan Čakarun (Sixt Primorska)

All-League Team
 Jan Špan (Petrol Olimpija)
 Blaž Mahkovic (Helios Suns)
 Donovon Jack (Hopsi Polzela)
 Marko Jagodić-Kuridža (Sixt Primorska)
 Marjan Čakarun (Sixt Primorska)

Regular Season Team
 Nejc Barič (Zlatorog)
 Blaž Mahkovic (Helios Suns)
 Marko Jagodić-Kuridža (Sixt Primorska)
 Davor Konjević (Šentjur)
 Ramo Rizvić (Šenčur)

Weekly MVP

Regular season

Second round

Note

 – Co-MVP's were announced.

Statistical leaders

| width=50% valign=top |

Points

|}
|}

| width=50% valign=top |

Assists

|}
|}

Clubs in European competitions

References

External links
Slovenian Basketball Federation

Slovenian Basketball League seasons
Slovenia
1